John Jensen (born 1965) is a Danish football manager and former player.

John(ny) or Jon(athan) Jensen may also refer to:

Jon A. Jensen, American military officer
Jon J. Jensen (born 1965), American lawyer and judge
Jon Jensen (cartoonist), for Tribune (magazine)
John Jensen (footballer, born 1937), Danish footballer
John Jensen (costume designer), American costume designer
John Jensen (public servant) (1884–1970), Australian senior public servant
John Erik Jensen (born 1945), Danish Olympic rower
Johnny Jensen (born 1972), Norwegian handball player
Johnny E. Jensen (born 1947), Danish cinematographer
Johnny Jensen (racecar driver), Danish racecar driver in FIA European Rallycross Championship
Johnny Jensen (actor), American actor, see List of General Hospital characters
Johnny Rønne Jensen (born 1974), Danish figure skater